Maulti is a town in Saint David Parish, Grenada.  It is located along the island's southern coast.

References 

Populated places in Grenada